David Novotný (born 12 June 1969) is a Czech actor. He has appeared in more than forty films since 1985.

Selected filmography

References

External links 

1969 births
Living people
Czech male film actors
People from Brandýs nad Labem-Stará Boleslav
Prague Conservatory alumni
Czech male stage actors
Czech male television actors
20th-century Czech male actors
21st-century Czech male actors